Robert Blocker, DMA (born September 4, 1946) is an American classical pianist, music educator, and university administrator, who has served as Dean of the Yale School of Music since July 1995.  He is a Steinway artist.

Career highlights 
{| class="wikitable"
|- valign="top"
! style="width:10%; text-align:left" | Institutions
! style="width:90%; text-align:left" |
|- valign="top"
| Yale
| Blocker is the Henry and Lucy Moses Dean of Music at Yale University, also holds the position of Professor of Piano, and is an affiliate Professor of Leadership Strategies at Yale University’s School of Management. During his tenure as dean, Blocker has seen the Yale School of Music endowment increase from $29 million to $375 million and planned additional commitments totaling $20 million. He presided over the restoration and renovation of the Yale music complex, which cost $100 million.  
|- valign="top"
| SMU
| Provost and Senior Vice President for Academic Affairs, Southern Methodist University, Dallas
|- valign="top"
| Yale
| Dean of Music, Yale University.
|- valign="top"
| UCLA| Professor and Founding Dean, School of the Arts and Architecture, and Professor of Management (Adjunct), Anderson School of Management, University of California, Los Angeles
|- valign="top"
| North Texas| Professor and Dean, College of Music, University of North Texas.  Blocker was an alumnus of North Texas (MM, 1970, DMA, 1972).  During his tenure, the endowment for the College of Music increased $2.25 million.
|- valign="top"
| Baylor| Professor and Dean, School of Music, Baylor University
|- valign="top"
|  UNCG| Professor and Dean, School of Music, University of North Carolina at Greensboro
|- valign="top"
| SFA| Associate Professor and Chairman, Department of Music, Stephen F. Austin State University, Nacogdoches
|- valign="top"
| Brevard| Associate Professor and Chairman, Division of Fine Arts, Brevard College, Brevard, North Carolina
|- valign="top"
|  Western Texas'| Associate Professor and Chairman, Division of Fine Arts, Western Texas College
|}

 Education 
Blocker earned a Bachelor of Arts degree from Furman University in 1968.  He earned graduate degrees — Master of Music in 1970 and Doctor of Musical Arts in 1972 — from the University of North Texas College of Music, where he studied with eminent American pianist Richard Brannan Cass (1931–2009), an alumnus of Furman and Juilliard and 1953 Fulbright Scholar to the National School of Music of Paris where he had studied with Nadia Boulanger.  In 1986, while serving as dean at Baylor, Blocker was a fellow at the Institute for Educational Management at Harvard in 1986.

 Honorary degrees 
 2014 — Doctor of Music, University of South Carolina
 2006 — Professor of Piano, Central Conservatory of Music, Beijing
 2003 — Doctor of Music, Converse College
 1995 — Master of Arts, Yale University
 1992 — Doctor of Humanities, Furman University

 Honors & awards 
 Elm-Ivy Award, Yale University, April 2008
 Founder's Award, PORTALS, The Hotchkiss School
 President’s Citation for Extraordinary Service, University of North Texas, 2005
 Honorary Professor of Piano, Central Conservatory of Music, Beijing, 2004
 Elected Member, The Grolier Club, New York City, a society for bibliophiles, 2003
 Yale Tercentennial Medal recipient, 2001
 Featured in Steinway and Sons film commemorating 300th anniversary of the piano, 2000
 Distinguished Alumni Award, Furman University, 1999
 Order of the Palmetto, 1999 (highest distinction of service awarded by the state of South Carolina)
 Outstanding Professor, Baylor University, 1986
 Artist-in-Residence, South Carolina Governor's School for the Arts & Humanities, 1985
 Teaching Excellence Award Grant, Stephen F. Austin State University, 1980
 Artist Teacher, National Piano Foundation, 1980–1981
 Artist Roster, Texas Commission on the Arts, 1978–1981
 Artist Faculty, Brevard Music Center, 1974–1976
 Outstanding Teacher Award, Brevard College, 1975
 Texas State Doctoral Fellowship, 1970–1972
 Outstanding Doctoral Candidate, University of North Texas College of Music, 1972
 Outstanding Masters Candidate, University of North Texas College of Music, 1970
 Rotary Scholar, 1964–1968
 Presser Scholar, 1964–1968

 Selected publications 

 Selected discography 

 Mozart, Piano Concertos Nos. 12, 13, and 14, Naxos Records (2010) 
 Recorded May 14–16, 2007, Morse Recital Hall, Sprague Hall, The School of Music, Yale University
 Blocker, piano; Biava Quartet

 Beethoven,  Piano Concerto No. 3'', Credia Classics (S. Korea) (2002)
 Recorded live, July 12, 2002, Beethoven Festival, Woosong Arts Center, Daejon, South Korea
 Blocker, piano
 Daejon Philharmonic, Shinik Hahm, conductor

Family & growing up 
Blocker is a graduate of the St. Andrews Parish High School, which as since merged with West Ashley High School in the Charleston County School District of South Carolina. He was president of the Charleston County Student Council and is a member of the St. Andrews Parish High School Hall of Fame.

References

External links 
 Blocker’s personal website
 Bio — Yale School of Music
 Bio — Yale School of Management

1946 births
American classical pianists
American male classical pianists
American choral conductors
American male conductors (music)
Furman University alumni
University of North Texas College of Music alumni
University of North Texas College of Music faculty
Yale University faculty
UCLA School of the Arts and Architecture faculty
Baylor University faculty
Harvard University alumni
Stephen F. Austin State University faculty
University of North Carolina at Greensboro faculty
Living people
American music educators
Texas classical music
20th-century American pianists
20th-century American conductors (music)
21st-century American conductors (music)
21st-century classical pianists
20th-century American male musicians
21st-century American male musicians
21st-century American pianists
UCLA Anderson School of Management faculty